Nola rufimixta is a moth of the family Nolidae first described by George Hampson in 1909. It is found in India and Sri Lanka.

Description
The male's antennae are fasciculate (bundled). Its forewings are a mottled pale dull brown. The brown antemedial line is double. Three plates of raised scales are found along the forewing costa.

References

Moths of Asia
Moths described in 1909
rufimixta